Football Club Chelyabinsk is a Russian football club from Chelyabinsk that currently plays in the FNL 2, the third tier of the Russian football league system.

It played professionally from 1989 to 1993 and from 1997 on. The club was called Strela Chelyabinsk (1977–1989) and Zenit Chelyabinsk (1990–2008). It played on the second-highest level, Russian First Division, in 1992 and 1993.

History 
The club was founded in 1977 as Strela Chelyabinsk. From 1977 to 1989 the club played in the regional leagues, and won the league title in 1980. The club also played the regional final 5 times, winning it in 1986 and 1987.  In 1990 the club was renamed to Zenit Chelyabinsk. It was promoted to the second-highest level, Russian First Division, in 1992. The following year, the club was relegated.

In 2009 the club was renamed to its current name, FC Chelyabinsk. The club made a great run in the 2009–10 Russian Cup, reaching the round of 16. Chelyabinsk entered the competition in the second round, where they beat FC Tyumen. In the third round, they defeated Gornyak Uchaly, and in the fourth round, they eliminated Gazovik Orenburg 4–1. In the fifth round, they defeated second division club FC KAMAZ. Now in the round of 32, the club produced a massive upset when they beat Russian Premier League club PFC Krylia. Their run came to an end in the round of 16, where Mordovia Saransk defeated them 2–0.

Current squad
As of 30 January 2023, according to the Second League website.

References

External links
Official Website

Association football clubs established in 1977
Football clubs in Russia
Sport in Chelyabinsk
1977 establishments in Russia